Deglazing refers to the removal of a shiny or smooth surface.

 Deglazing (cooking), using a liquid to remove cooked-on residue from a pan
 Deglazing (engine mechanics), abrading the polished surface of a cylinder 
 Removal of the ceramic glaze from pottery

See also
 Glaze (disambiguation)